Conocotocko is the English rendering of ᎬᎾᎦᏙᎦ (Gvnagadoga), Cherokee for "Standing Turkey". It may refer to:
 Conocotocko I (also called "Old Hop"), Cherokee chief 1753–1760
 Conocotocko II (also called "Standing Turkey"), Cherokee chief beginning 1760